Sikamat is a small town in Seremban District, Negeri Sembilan, Malaysia. The area contains many government schools and is one of the denser locations for them; SMK Tunku Ampuan Durah, SMK Dato' Sheikh Ahmad, SMK Haji Mohd Redza, SM Sains Tuanku Aishah Rohani (SGS), SM Sains Tuanku Munawir (SASER), SK Sikamat and the Institut Perguruan Raja Melewar, located beside the road towards Masjid Kariah Sikamat.

References

Seremban District
Towns in Negeri Sembilan